Heartbreak Lullaby was A-Teens fourth and final single from the German and Scandinavian versions of their second studio album Teen Spirit and for The Princess Diaries movie soundtrack in Europe and Asia. The song was written by Jan Kask, Peter Mansson and Cathy Dennis. By public demand, the song was released on radio and TV in Mexico in January 2002 to promote the re-release of the album Teen Spirit reaching 58 on the Airplay Chart.

"...To The Music" was originally planned as the fourth single from the album, but Disney wanted the A-Teens to participate on the soundtrack for the movie The Princess Diaries, the movie was already out in the United States and Latin America, for that reason, the single was only released in Europe and Asia.

The song reached number 6 on the Swedish charts and 77 on the German charts in December 2001.

The single release had "I Wish It Could Be Christmas Everyday" added and it was later included on a Disney Compilation of Christmas Songs for the American market.

For the radio promotion and the video, the "Ray Hedges 7" Mix" of the track from the Teen Spirit (New Edition) album was used instead of the main version of the song. the "Ballad version" of the album was later included on the Greatest Hits and their third studio album New Arrival.

Music video
The video was filmed in Germany and features scenes from the movie The Princess Diaries.

Releases
European 2-track CD single
Heartbreak Lullaby (Cathy Dennis) [Ray Hedges 7" Remix] - 4:07
I Wish It Could Be Christmas Everyday (Roy Wood) - 3:19

European/South-African CD Maxi
Heartbreak Lullaby (Cathy Dennis) [Ray Hedges 7" Remix] - 4:07
Heartbreak Lullaby (Cathy Dennis) [Ballad Version] - 4:08
Heartbreak Lullaby (Cathy Dennis) [Europop Remix] - 3:35
Heartbreak Lullaby (Cathy Dennis) [Techno Earthbound Mix] - 4:14
I Wish It Could Be Christmas Everyday (Roy Wood) - 3:19

Weekly charts

Release history

References

A-Teens songs
Songs written by Cathy Dennis
2001 songs
Universal Music Group singles
Songs written by Peter Mansson